Marino Torlonia (29 July 1861 – 5 March 1933), 4th Prince of Civitella-Cesi, duke of Poli and Guadagnolo, was an Italian nobleman.

Biography
He was born in Poli, Italy, the sixth son of Prince Don Giulio Torlonia, 2nd Duke di Poli e di Guadagnolo, and his wife, Princess Donna Teresa Chigi della Rovere-Albani.

Torlonia's paternal grandmother was Princess Donna Anna Sforza-Cesarini, a descendant of Ludovico Sforza, Duke of Milan and patron of Leonardo da Vinci. Torlonia's maternal grandmother was Princess Donna Leopoldina Doria-Pamphili-Landi, the granddaughter of Princess Leopoldina of Savoy, a princess of the royal family of Piedmont and Sardinia, which later became the Royal Family of Italy. The descendant of many popes, Torlonia inherited the administration of the Banca Torlonia, which worked the finances of the Vatican and several other investments. He was one of the richest noblemen in Italy around the beginning of the twentieth century, and introduced the first motor car in Rome.

Personal life
On August 15, 1907, Torlonia married Mary Elsie Moore (1889–1941), a Connecticut heiress who was studying in Rome. She was a daughter of the American shipping broker Charles Arthur Moore, a tool manufacturer in Greenwich, Connecticut, and of Mary L. Campbell. Mary Elsie Moore's brothers were Eugene Maxwell Moore (who married Titanic survivor Margaret Graham) and her niece, Bettine Moore, daughter of another brother, Charles Arthur Moore, Jr. (who was a part of Robert Peary's Arctic Expedition in the summer of 1897), married William Taliaferro Close (they are the parents of actress Glenn Close).

Marino Torlonia and Mary Elsie Moore had four children: 
Princess Donna Olimpia Torlonia di Civitella-Cesi
Don Alessandro Torlonia, 5th Prince of Civitella-Cesi (1911–1986), who married the Infanta Beatriz of Spain (1909–2002), the daughter of King Alfonso XIII of Spain.
Princess Donna Cristina Torlonia di Civitella-Cesi
Princess Donna Marina Torlonia di Civitella-Cesi (1916–1960), who married two Americans: Francis Xavier Shields (1909–1975) (by whom she became grandmother of the actress Brooke Shields) and Edward Slater.

He died on 5 March 1933.

Ancestry

See also
House of Torlonia

References

1861 births
1933 deaths
M
People from the Metropolitan City of Rome Capital
Marino
Dukes of Poli
Dukes of Guadagnolo